Strange Day is an EP by Clay People, released in 1996 by Re-Constriction Records.

Track listing

Personnel
Adapted from the Strange Day liner notes.

Clay People
 Brian McGarvey – electric guitar, bass guitar, programming
 Daniel Neet – lead vocals, programming

Additional musicians
 Wade Alin – additional programming (8)
 Jared Cummings – guest vocals (8)
 Alex Eller – additional instrumentation (9)
 John Partridge – saxophone (5)

Production and design
 DJ Killroy – additional production (7)
 George Hagegeorge – production (1, 2, 5)
 STR – additional production (4)
 D. Patrick Walsh – art direction, design
 Brady McTague – art direction, design

Release history

References

External links 
 Strange Day at Discogs (list of releases)

1996 EPs
Remix EPs
The Clay People albums
Re-Constriction Records EPs